Swindon Borough Council is the local authority for the unitary authority of Swindon in Wiltshire, England. Until 1 April 1997 its area was a non-metropolitan district called Thamesdown Borough Council, with Wiltshire County Council providing the county-level services. Also in April 1997, less than a month after taking over the county-level services, the council changed its name from Thamesdown to Swindon.

Political control
Since the first election to the new Thamesdown borough council in 1973, political control of the council has been held by the following parties:

Thamesdown (district council)

Swindon Borough Council (unitary authority)

Leadership
The role of mayor is largely ceremonial in Swindon, with political leadership instead being provided by the leader of the council. The leaders since 1998 have been:

Council elections

District council
1973 Thamesdown Borough Council election
1976 Thamesdown Borough Council election (New ward boundaries)
1978 Thamesdown Borough Council election
1979 Thamesdown Borough Council election
1980 Thamesdown Borough Council election
1982 Thamesdown Borough Council election (Some new ward boundaries & borough boundary changes)
1983 Thamesdown Borough Council election
1984 Thamesdown Borough Council election
1986 Thamesdown Borough Council election (New ward boundaries)
1987 Thamesdown Borough Council election
1988 Thamesdown Borough Council election
1990 Thamesdown Borough Council election
1991 Thamesdown Borough Council election
1992 Thamesdown Borough Council election
1994 Thamesdown Borough Council election
1995 Thamesdown Borough Council election
1996 Thamesdown Borough Council election

Unitary authority
1998 Swindon Borough Council election
1999 Swindon Borough Council election
2000 Swindon Borough Council election (New ward boundaries increased the number of seats by 5)
2002 Swindon Borough Council election
2003 Swindon Borough Council election
2004 Swindon Borough Council election
2006 Swindon Borough Council election
2007 Swindon Borough Council election
2008 Swindon Borough Council election
2010 Swindon Borough Council election
2011 Swindon Borough Council election
2012 Swindon Borough Council election (New ward boundaries)
2014 Swindon Borough Council election
2015 Swindon Borough Council election (New ward boundaries)
2016 Swindon Borough Council election
2018 Swindon Borough Council election
2019 Swindon Borough Council election
2021 Swindon Borough Council election
2022 Swindon Borough Council election

Results maps

By-election results

1997–2001

2001–2005

2009–2013

References

External links
Swindon Borough Council
By-election results

 
Council elections in Wiltshire
Politics of the Borough of Swindon
Unitary authority elections in England